Evan McCaskey was an American guitarist who played for the bands Exodus and Blind Illusion.

McCaskey grew up in Point Richmond, California. Prior to joining the band Blind Illusion, he taught guitar lessons in his Point Richmond studio. He committed suicide on September 28, 1989, at the age of 24.

1965 births
1989 suicides
American heavy metal guitarists
20th-century American guitarists
American male guitarists
Blind Illusion members
Exodus (American band) members
20th-century American male musicians
Suicides in the United States